Alwin Houtsma is a Dutch Paralympic swimmer. He represented the Netherlands at the 1996 Summer Paralympics and at the 2000 Summer Paralympics. At the 1996 Summer Paralympics held in Atlanta, United States, he won two gold medals. At the 2000 Summer Paralympics in Sydney, Australia, he won five gold medals, two silver medals and one bronze medal.

References

External links 

Living people
Year of birth missing (living people)
Place of birth missing (living people)
Dutch male backstroke swimmers
Dutch male butterfly swimmers
Dutch male breaststroke swimmers
Dutch male freestyle swimmers
Dutch male medley swimmers
Swimmers at the 1996 Summer Paralympics
Swimmers at the 2000 Summer Paralympics
Paralympic gold medalists for the Netherlands
Paralympic silver medalists for the Netherlands
Paralympic bronze medalists for the Netherlands
Paralympic medalists in swimming
Paralympic swimmers of the Netherlands
Medalists at the 1996 Summer Paralympics
Medalists at the 2000 Summer Paralympics
S14-classified Paralympic swimmers
21st-century Dutch people